The Ring is a 1985 Romanian drama film directed by Sergiu Nicolaescu. It was entered into the 14th Moscow International Film Festival.

Cast
 Marin Moraru as Tom
 Sergiu Nicolaescu as Tudor Andrei
 Constantin Brînzea as Tudor Andrei tanar
 Mihai Vasile Boghiță as Adolf Gebauer batran / Martin Hoffmann 'Golem' (as Mihai V. Boghita)
 Marian Culiniac as Adolf Gebauer tanar
 Karl Michael Vogler as Crainicul arenei de box (as Mihail Vogler)
 Laetitia Gabrielli as Karin (as Letitia Gabrielli)
 Iurie Darie as reprezentantul companiei Bio-Aktiv
 Sebastian Papaiani as prezentatorul Bio-Aktiv si organizatorul meciului
 Maria Banica as Balerina care spala podelele în lagar
 Corneliu Gîrbea as reprezentantul companiei Bio-Aktiv (as Cornel Gîrbea)
 Eusebiu Ștefănescu as Comandantul lagarului

References

External links
 

1984 films
1984 drama films
1980s Romanian-language films
Films directed by Sergiu Nicolaescu
Romanian drama films
1985 drama films
1985 films